The 2014 Detroit Thunder season is the second season for the Continental Indoor Football League (CIFL) franchise.

In June 2013, the Thunder agreed to terms with the CIFL to return for the 2014 season. The team was originally supposed to play the season at Fraser Hockeyland but was unable to secure turf for the arena, forcing the team to move to the Perani Arena and Event Center in Flint, Michigan for the only home game the Thunder would play that season. The team attempted to return to Fraser Hockeyland for the rest of the season but ceased operations after being forced to forfeit a game against the eventual champion Erie Explosion because of continuing turf problems at the arena.

Roster

Schedule

Regular season

ASI Panthers played this game in the Detroit Thunder's stead.

Standings

Coaching staff

References

2014 Continental Indoor Football League season
Detroit Thunder
Detroit Thunder